Manirul Islam Sarkar (1965 – 3 December 2017) was an Indian Bengali politician and teacher. He was the former two-time member of the Meghalaya Legislative Assembly for the Phulbari constituency in West Garo Hills district. Sarkar was also the Cabinet Minister for Agriculture and Transport.

Early life and education
Sarkar was born into a Bengali Muslim family in Chibinang, Meghalaya. His father was Abdul Jabbar Sarkar. Sarkar graduated from the Gauhati University in 1989 with a Bachelor of Science honour.

Career
Sarkar began his career as a teacher before stepping into politics. Despite being an independent candidate, he defeated his rival Akramozzaman of the Indian National Congress at the 1993 Meghalaya Legislative Assembly election, winning a seat at the Phulbari constituency. He lost to Abu Taher Mondal at the 1998 Meghalaya Legislative Assembly election, but made a comeback at the 2003 Meghalaya Legislative Assembly election. He competed in the 2008 Meghalaya Legislative Assembly election as a Indian National Congress candidate and in the 2013 Meghalaya Legislative Assembly election as a Samajwadi Party candidate but was defeated again by Abu Taher Mondal. In 2014, he joined the National People's Party.

He has purchased vast amounts of land in Bholarbhita, Goladighli and Bangalkata. Sarkar also served as the chairman for Meghalaya Transport Corporation and the Minister of Agriculture & Transport.

Later life and death
He later migrated to Guwahati in Assam where he established himself at the Meghalaya House. Sarkar suffered from a heart attack on 1 November 2017 and taken to hospital. He went to Chennai on 9 November and had a successful operation, returning to Guwahati on 17 November. As a result of a second heart attack, Sarkar died on 3 December 2017. His funeral, conducted in his home village of Chibinang in Meghalaya, was attended by thousands including the senior representatives of the National People's Party as well as his political rival Abu Taher Mondal. Among his brothers are politician Rahibul Islam Sarkar and Phulbari's MLA SG Esmatur Mominin.

References

Indian National Congress politicians from Meghalaya
Meghalaya MLAs 1993–1998
1965 births
2017 deaths
20th-century Bengalis
21st-century Bengalis
People from West Garo Hills district
20th-century Indian Muslims
21st-century Indian Muslims
Indian Sunni Muslims
Gauhati University alumni